Roy Gerrard (25 January 1935 – 5 August 1997) was an English author and illustrator who wrote a number of picture books for children.

References

1935 births
1997 deaths
English children's writers
English children's book illustrators